Carsten Dehmlow (born 1977) is a German swimmer who won seven medals at European Short Course Swimming Championships of 1998–2004. While winning gold medals in 2001, 2002 and 2003 his team set new world records in the 4×50 m medley relay.

References

1977 births
Living people
German male swimmers
20th-century German people
21st-century German people